Neddy or Neddie may refer to:

 Neddy Rose (born 1981), Seychellois football player
 Neddy Smith (born 1944), Australian criminal and crime writer
 Neddy Merrill, protagonist of the short story "The Swimmer" by John Cheever
 Neddie Seagoon, a character in the 1950s British radio comedy show The Goon Show

See also

Nedda, given name